Liss Forest is a hamlet neighbouring the larger village of Liss, in Hampshire, England. It formerly had its own railway station on the now closed Longmoor Military Railway. Liss Forest has a pub (The Temple). Liss Forest is surrounded by open forest land much of which is owned by the Ministry of Defence and is used for military training.

Villages in Hampshire